Margaret Grant may refer to:
 Margaret Macpherson Grant (1834–1877), Scottish heiress and philanthropist
 Margaret Grant (boccia), Irish boccia player
 One of the many pseudonyms of John R. Coryell, American dime novelist
 A pen name used by William Brown Meloney V and Rose Franken when they wrote together